Lauren Roma Cheatle (born 6 November 1998) is an Australian cricketer who plays as a left-arm fast-medium bowler and left-handed batter. She plays domestic cricket for New South Wales in the Women's National Cricket League (WNCL) and the Sydney Sixers in the Women's Big Bash League (WBBL). Between 2016 and 2019, she played 11 matches for the Australian national cricket team.

Domestic cricket
Cheatle plays for the New South Wales Breakers in the Women's National Cricket League. She played her first match for the Breakers on 1 November 2015.

Cheatle previously played for the Sydney Thunder in the Women's Big Bash League. In the 2015–16 season, she took 18 wickets finishing equal 4th in the most wickets list. She was at the bowler's end when the Thunder won the inaugural WBBL final when Claire Koski scored two runs off an overthrow. She joined the Sydney Sixers ahead of the 2017–18 Women's Big Bash League season.

International career
Cheatle played her first match for the Australia women's national cricket team in a Women's Twenty20 International against India on 29 January 2016.

On 26 February 2017, she made her Women's One Day International (WODI) debut against New Zealand.

After missing out on Australia's squad for the 2017 World Cup in England, Cheatle was recalled to the side as part of their squad for the Women's Ashes. She was named in both the ODI squad and the Test squad. In April 2019, Cricket Australia awarded her with a contract with the National Performance Squad ahead of the 2019–20 season.

References

External links

Lauren Cheatle at Cricket Australia

1998 births
Australia women One Day International cricketers
Australia women Twenty20 International cricketers
Living people
New South Wales Breakers cricketers
People from Bowral
Sydney Thunder (WBBL) cricketers
Sydney Sixers (WBBL) cricketers
Cricketers from New South Wales